Lady Margaret Hall Boat Club (LMHBC) is a rowing club for members and staff of Lady Margaret Hall (LMH), Oxford.  It was founded in 1899.

History 

LMHBC first competed in inter-college OURCs racing events in 1977, when a women's division was finally established (LMH was a women-only college for the first 100 years of its foundation).  As the senior women's college LMH was placed first on the river for the inaugural women's division. The club has provided rowers for the Boat Race, the Women's Boat Race, and the Isis Reserves Race.

A former president, Monica Fisher (née Pring-Mill) was responsible for instigating some of the biggest changes in Women's Boat Race history, which raised the regularity and status of that event.

For a period around 2010 three times World Lightweight Sculling Champion Peter Moir Haining coached LMHBC.

The club is affiliated to British Rowing.

Results

Men's crews 
Men's crews began competing for LMHBC in 1979/1980 (the year after LMH first admitted men).  As a new boat, they entered the table at the bottom as 90th on the river.  Over the following years, the Men's 1st VIII have gradually risen up the rankings. After first rowing in Division 1 as sandwich boat in 2017, the Men's 1st VIII finally secured their place in Division 1 for the first time in Summer Eights 2019.

The men's second VIII are 57th on the river as of 2019. A men's third VIII is periodically fielded. The Men's 1st VIII have raced in the Temple Challenge Cup at Henley Royal Regatta on several occasions.

Women's crews 

The LMHBC women's first VIII had the Summer Eights headship in 1977, the inaugural year of women's inclusion in Summer Eights as recognised, distinct divisions. In 2017 it was 24th on the river. The LMH women's first VIII had the Torpids Headship in 1978 and was 25th on the river in 2019.

The LMHBC Women's second VIII first raced in 1986 and was 59th on the river in 2017. A women's third eight is periodically fielded.

Recent Blues 
Recent members of LMHBC selected for Oxford men's crew for The Boat Race include:

 Zachary Thomas Johnson 2018
 Felix Drinkall in 2018 2019 2020 and 2021
 Oliver Perry in 2020
 Annie Anezakis in 2022

Blazer 

The boat club has an ivory blazer with blue and gold piping and cuff rings bearing the Beaufort portcullis device in blue on the left breast. This may be worn by men and women who have rowed in the first Summer VIII or first Torpid.

See also 
 Oxford University Rowing Clubs
 University rowing (UK)

References

External links 
 Eights Week Chart, 1980–2008 (use menus for other charts)
 Lady Margaret Hall Boat Club Website

Sports clubs established in 1965
Rowing clubs of the University of Oxford
Boat Club
1976 establishments in England
Rowing clubs in Oxfordshire
Rowing clubs of the River Thames